Morro Gonzalo is a steep hill and northward headland marking the western limit of Corral Bay in Chile. During colonial times it hosted an observation post and a cannon of 4 pounds which was part of the Valdivian Fort System. There is a South American sea lion colony at the base of Morro Gonzalo. In 1996 there were 34 sea lions, of which about 15 where adult males, 10 were females and 10 were juveniles.

References

Headlands of Chile
Coasts of Los Ríos Region
Cliffs of Chile
Seabird colonies
South American sea lion colonies